L'Avventura is a 1960 Italian drama film directed by Michelangelo Antonioni. Developed from a story by Antonioni with co-writers Elio Bartolini and Tonino Guerra, the film is about the disappearance of a young woman (Lea Massari) during a boating trip in the Mediterranean, and the subsequent search for her by her lover (Gabriele Ferzetti) and her best friend (Monica Vitti). It was filmed on location in Rome, the Aeolian Islands, and Sicily in 1959 under difficult financial and physical conditions. The film is noted for its unusual pacing, which emphasizes visual composition, mood, and character over traditional narrative development.

L'Avventura was nominated for numerous awards and was awarded the Jury Prize at the 1960 Cannes Film Festival. The film made Monica Vitti an international star. According to an Antonioni obituary, the film "systematically subverted the filmic codes, practices and structures in currency at its time". L'Avventura is the first film of a trilogy by Antonioni, followed by La Notte (1961) and L'Eclisse (1962). It has appeared on Sight & Sounds list of the critics' top ten greatest films ever made three times in a row: It was voted second in 1962, fifth in 1972 and seventh in 1982. In 2010, it was ranked #40 in Empire magazine's "The 100 Best Films of World Cinema". The film would go on to influence several arthouse directors, including Apichatpong Weerasethakul, Jia Zhangke, and Hirokazu Kore-eda.

Plot
Anna (Lea Massari) and her friend Claudia (Monica Vitti) meet up at Anna's father's villa before embarking on a yachting trip along the Mediterranean. They head into Rome to meet Anna's boyfriend, Sandro, near Pons Fabricius. While Claudia waits downstairs, Anna and Sandro make love in his house. Sandro then drives the two women to the coast where they join two affluent couples for their voyage. The next day, the group reaches the Aeolian Islands, and Anna jumps into the water for a swim. Sandro follows her when she claims to have seen a shark, only to find out later that it was a lie.

During their trip, Anna confides in Sandro about her unhappiness with his frequent business trips, but he dismisses her concerns and takes a nap on the rocks. Later, Corrado (James Addams) becomes concerned about the weather and decides to leave the island. However, Anna goes missing, and Sandro brushes it off as typical behavior. They search the island but find nothing. Sandro, Corrado, and Claudia stay behind to continue the search, while the others notify the authorities. As they search, Sandro takes offense when Claudia suggests his neglect may have played a role in Anna's disappearance.

The police conduct a thorough search but find nothing, and Anna's father arrives. Sandro decides to investigate nearby smugglers, but before leaving, he kisses Claudia, startling her. She decides to search other islands alone, and they agree to meet up later in Palermo. Sandro realizes that the smugglers have no information about Anna's disappearance. When Claudia arrives, they meet at the train station, and their attraction is evident, but Claudia urges him to leave. She boards a train to Palermo, and as it departs, Sandro jumps aboard. Claudia is annoyed, but Sandro sees no sense in sacrificing their attraction. Claudia is troubled by how easily things can change. Sandro relents and gets off the train at Castroreale.

In Messina, Sandro meets with journalist Zuria, who suggests Anna may have been seen by a chemist in Troina. Sandro bribes Zuria for another story and heads to Troina. Meanwhile, Claudia arrives at Corrado's villa, where no one takes Anna's disappearance seriously. Claudia leaves for Troina after reading Zuria's follow-up story. In Troina, Sandro and Claudia track down a chemist who claims to have sold tranquilizers to Anna. They learn that the woman identified by the chemist left for Noto in southern Sicily. Together, they drive south, stopping at a deserted village before making love on a hill overlooking the town. In Noto, they search for Anna at the Trinacria Hotel, but find nothing. Claudia remains conflicted between her feelings for Sandro and her loyalty to Anna.

At the Chiesa del Collegio, Sandro reveals his disappointment with his career and proposes to Claudia, but she declines. The next morning, they both seem to be passionately in love, but Claudia resists his advances and suggests they leave. In Taormina, Sandro and Claudia stay at the San Domenico Palace Hotel while Sandro's boss and his wife prepare for a party. Claudia decides to skip it, while Sandro checks out the women and recognizes Gloria Perkins (Dorothy De Poliolo), a beautiful 19-year-old "writer" and aspiring actress who is actually an expensive prostitute. Later, Claudia searches for Sandro and finds him embracing Gloria. Heartbroken, Claudia runs off, and Sandro follows her to the hotel terrace. There, they both cry and Claudia enigmatically places her hand on Sandro's head as they look out at Mount Etna in the distance.

Cast

 Gabriele Ferzetti as Sandro
 Monica Vitti as Claudia
 Lea Massari as Anna
 Dominique Blanchar as Giulia
 Renzo Ricci as Anna's Father
 James Addams as Corrado
 Dorothy de Poliolo as Gloria Perkins
 Lelio Luttazzi as Raimondo
 Giovanni Petrucci as Prince Goffredo
 Esmeralda Ruspoli as Patrizia
 Jack O'Connell as Old Man on the Island
 Angela Tomasi di Lampedusa as The Princess
 Prof. Cucco as Ettore
 Renato Pinciroli as Zuria, the journalist

Production
Shooting began in August 1959 and lasted until 15 January 1960. Antonioni began filming the island sequence with the scenes immediately after Anna disappears. The majority of shooting on the island was filmed on the island Lisca Bianca (white fish bone) with a cast and crew of 50 people. Other locations for the island sequence included Panarea (which was the production's headquarters), Mondello and Palermo. Filming the island sequence was intended to take three weeks, but ended up lasting for four months. Difficulties included the islands being infested with rats, mosquitoes and reptiles; also, the weather was unexpectedly cold, and the navy ship hired to transport the cast and crew to the island every day never appeared. In order to carry personal items and equipment to the island, the crew had to build small rafts out of empty gas canisters and wooden planks; these were towed by a launching tug every morning.

One week after shooting began, the film's production company went bankrupt, leaving the production in short supplies of food and water. Antonioni still had a large supply of film stock and managed to get the cast and crew to work for free until funding for the film was found. At one point, ships stopped making trips to Lisca Bianca, and the cast and crew were stranded for three days without food or blankets. Eventually, the crew went on strike and Antonioni and his assistant director shot the film themselves. Due to the rough condition of the sea and the difficulty in landing a ship on the rough rocks of Lisca Bianca, the cast and crew were forced to sleep on the island. Antonioni has stated that he "woke up every morning at 3 o'clock in order to be alone and reflect on what I was doing in order to re-load myself against fatigue and a strange form of apathy or absence of will, which often took hold of us all". After several weeks of Antonioni and the crew working without a budget, the production company Cino del Duca agreed to finance the film and sent money to him.

Whilst shooting on the 40-foot yacht for scenes early in the film, the cast and crew totaled 23 people. Antonioni had wanted to shoot the film chronologically, but the yacht was not available until November. Owing to the cold weather, actress Lea Massari developed a cardiac condition after spending several days swimming in the Mediterranean Sea during filming, and spent several days in a coma after being rushed to Rome for medical treatment.

After completing the island sequence, filming continued throughout Sicily and Italy. The sequence on the train from Castroreale to Cefalù took two days to shoot instead of the intended three hours. The scene in Messina where Sandro encounters Gloria Perkins took two days to shoot; Antonioni initially wanted 400 extras for it. Only 100 turned up, so crew members recruited passers-by on the street to appear in the scene. The sequence where Sandro and Claudia visit a deserted town was shot in Santa Panagia, near Catania in Sicily; buildings there were commissioned by Benito Mussolini, and were examples of fascist architecture of the Mezzogiorno. The scene where Sandro and Claudia first have sex took 10 days to shoot, owing to the crew having to wait for a train to pass by every morning.

Antonioni wrote that the film was "expressed through images in which I hope to show not the birth of an erroneous sentiment, but rather the way in which we go astray in our sentiments. Because as I have said, our moral values are old. Our myths and conventions are old. And everyone knows that they are indeed old and outmoded. Yet we respect them".

Metro-Goldwyn-Mayer, American-International Pictures, Paramount Pictures and Warner Bros. refused the US distribution rights, so Antonioni sold the project to Columbia Pictures.

Filming locations
L'Avventura was filmed on location in Rome, the Aeolian Islands, and Sicily.

Music
The film's musical score was composed by Giovanni Fusco, who had scored all of Antonioni's films up to that time. Antonioni usually only used diegetic music in his films and this was one of the latter times that he (briefly) included a musical score for scenes other than during the credits. For L'Avventura, Antonioni asked Fusco to compose "jazz as though it had been written in the Hellenic era".

Release
L'Avventura grossed 340 million lire in Italy during its initial release in Italy.

Reception
Critical response
Despite the film's eventual lionization by film scholars, the film received a harsh reception at its opening in May at the 1960 Cannes Film Festival. It is one of the festival's more notorious reactions. According to Vitti, the screening of Cannes was a real-life drama. From the opening titles, despite the film's serious tone, laughs erupted in a dark theater packed with critics and photographers. Laughs continued through the runtime, joined by boos. Gene Youngblood said that audience members usually booed during long sequences where nothing happened to further the film's plot, but has asserted that "quite a lot is happening in these scenes". Antonioni and Vitti, who claimed she was sobbing, fled the theater.

The next day, however, the filmmakers were sent a list of signatures from established filmmakers and writers who declared that L'Avventura was the best movie screened at Cannes. After a second screening, the film went on to win the Jury Prize at the same festival, and went on to international box office success and what has been described as "hysteria". Youngblood described the trilogy of which L'Avventura is the first component as a "unified statement about the malady of the emotional life in contemporary times".

Bosley Crowther of The New York Times called the film a "weird adventure" and praised its cinematography and performances. Andrew Sarris of The Village Voice called it the movie-going phenomenon of 1961, and praised Antonioni's depiction of characters that cannot communicate with each other. Stanley Kauffmann of The New Republic wrote that "Antonioni is trying to exploit the unique powers of the film as distinct from the theater...He attempts to get from film the same utility of the medium itself as a novelist whose point is not story but mood and character and for whom the texture of the prose works as much as what he says in the prose".

Martin Scorsese included it on a list of "39 Essential Foreign Films for a Young Filmmaker".

Alexander Walker judged it the best film ever made.

Awards and nominations
 1960 Cannes Film Festival Jury Prize (Michelangelo Antonioni) Won 1960 Cannes Film Festival Palme d'Or Nomination (Michelangelo Antonioni)
 1960 British Film Institute Sutherland Trophy (Michelangelo Antonioni) Won 1961 BAFTA Award Nomination for Best Film from any Source (Michelangelo Antonioni)
 1961 BAFTA Award Nomination for Best Foreign Actress (Monica Vitti)
 1961 Golden Globe Award for Best Breakthrough Actress (Monica Vitti) Won 1961 Italian National Syndicate of Film Journalists Silver Ribbon for Best Score (Giovanni Fusco) Won'''
 1961 Italian National Syndicate of Film Journalists Silver Ribbon Nomination for Best Actress (Monica Vitti)
 1961 Italian National Syndicate of Film Journalists Silver Ribbon Nomination for Best Cinematography, B/W (Aldo Scavarda)
 1961 Italian National Syndicate of Film Journalists Silver Ribbon Nomination for Best Director (Michelangelo Antonioni)
 1961 Italian National Syndicate of Film Journalists Silver Ribbon Nomination for Best Original Story (Michelangelo Antonioni)
 1961 Italian National Syndicate of Film Journalists Silver Ribbon Nomination for Best Supporting Actress (Lea Massari)

LegacyL'Avventura influenced the visual language of cinema, changing how subsequent films looked, and has been named by some critics as one of the best ever made. However, it has been criticized by others for its seemingly uneventful plot and slow pacing, along with the existentialist themes. Youngblood wrote that "very few films in the history of cinema have broken the standard rules of cinematic grammar so elegantly, so subtly, as this film". Jonathan Rosenbaum has called it a masterpiece. Roger Ebert wrote that he came to like the film later in life when he began to admire the "clarity and passion Antonioni brought to the film's silent cry of despair". Geoff Andrew of Time Out criticized the film, writing that "if it once seemed the ultimate in arty, intellectually chic movie-making, the film now looks all too studied and remote a portrait of emotional sterility". Michael Phillips of the Chicago Tribune defended the film against Andrew's criticism, writing that "it's easy to bash Antonioni as passe. It's harder, I think, to explain the cinematic power of the way his camera watches, and waits, while the people on screen stave off a dreadful loneliness".

It has appeared on Sight & Sound's prestigious list of the critics' top 10 greatest films ever made three times in a row: it was voted second in 1962, fifth in 1972 and seventh in 1982. It currently ranks #21 (43 critics having voted for it) in the critics' poll and #30 (14 directors' votes) in the directors' poll. In 2010, it was ranked #40 in Empire magazine's "The 100 Best Films of World Cinema". The film was included in BBC's 2018 list of The 100 greatest foreign language films ranked by 209 
film critics from 43 countries around the world.

Meaning
Much has been made of Anna's unsolved disappearance, which Roger Ebert has described as being linked to the film's mostly wealthy, bored, and spoiled characters, none of whom have fulfilling relationships. They are all, wrote Ebert, "on the brink of disappearance".

According to Alain Robbe-Grillet, many shots in the "continental" part of the film are taken from the point of view of an unseen character, as if Anna was following Sandro and Claudia to see what they would do. When asked, Antonioni told Robbe-Grillet that the "missing" scene (showing Anna's body recovered from the sea) was scripted and actually filmed but did not make it into the final cut, apparently for timing reasons.

Home media
A digitally restored version of the film (optimal image quality: RSDL dual-layer edition) was released on DVD by The Criterion Collection (under license of Columbia TriStar) in June 2001. The release includes audio commentary by film historian Gene Youngblood, an English subtitle translation, a 58-minute documentary by Gianfranco Mingozzi titled Antonioni: Documents and Testimonials'' (1966), and writings by Antonioni read by Jack Nicholson with Nicholson's personal recollections of the director.

Notes

References

Bibliography

External links
 
 
 
 
 L'avventura: A Present Absence an essay by Geoffrey Nowell-Smith at the Criterion Collection

1959 films
1950s adventure drama films
Italian black-and-white films
Films about missing people
Films directed by Michelangelo Antonioni
Films set in Sicily
Films set in the Mediterranean Sea
Films shot in Italy
Italian adventure drama films
1950s Italian-language films
Films with screenplays by Tonino Guerra
Films scored by Giovanni Fusco
Existentialist films
1959 drama films
1950s Italian films
1960s Italian films